The 13th Annual Latin Grammy Awards was held on Thursday, November 15, 2012 at the Mandalay Bay Events Center in Las Vegas, Nevada. It was the fifth time the awards was held at this venue and in Las Vegas. It also marks the last year in the Latin Recording Academy's contract where the Mandalay Bay Events Center hosted. It is unknown if the awards will continue to be held at this location beyond 2012.

Recordings must have been released between July 1, 2011 and June 30, 2012 in order to be eligible for the 13th Latin Grammy Awards. Nominations were announced on September 25, 2012. Juan Luis Guerra led the nominations field with six; Jesse & Joy earned five nods; Ricardo Arjona, Edgar Barrera, Juanes, Carla Morrison, Arturo Sandoval, Ivete Sangalo, and Caetano Veloso each received four nominations. The telecast was aired on Univision at 8pm/7c. Caetano Veloso was honored as the Latin Recording Academy Person of the Year on November 14, 2012.

Jesse & Joy won four awards including Record of the Year and Song of the Year for "¡Corre!", Juanes took the Album of the Year for MTV Unplugged and 3BallMTY was named Best New Artist.

Changes to award categories
On May 10, 2012 the Latin Recording Academy announced that The Academy's Trustees approved changes in the general and pop fields and expanded the Rock and Tropical fields, bringing the total number of categories from 46 to 47:

Each of the four categories in the general field (Album of the Year, Record of the Year, Song of the Year and Best New Artist) will now include 10 nominees.
The Pop Field: The three categories (Best Female Pop Vocal Album, Best Male Pop Vocal Album and Best Pop Album by a Duo or Group with Vocals) will now be combined in two new categories: Best Contemporary Pop Vocal Album and Best Traditional Pop Vocal Album.
The Rock Field: A new category, called Best Pop/Rock Album, was added.
The Tropical Field: A new category, called Best Tropical Fusion Album, was added.
The Alternative Field: Both categories (Best Alternative Music Album and Best Alternative Song) will now accept recordings in the Portuguese language.
The Brazilian field: The category Best Native Brazilian Roots Album is now called Best Brazilian Roots Album.

Awards
The following is a list of nominees:

Bold indicates winner.

General
Record of the Year
Jesse & Joy — "¡Corre!"
Ricardo Arjona and Gaby Moreno — "Fuiste Tú"
ChocQuibTown featuring Tego Calderón and Zully Murillo — "Calentura"
Kany García — "Que Te Vaya Mal"
Juan Luis Guerra — "En El Cielo No Hay Hospital"
Juanes featuring Joaquín Sabina — "Azul Sabina"
Maná — "Hasta Que Te Conocí"
Ivete Sangalo — "Atrás da Porta"
Alejandro Sanz — "No Me Compares"
Zoé — "Bésame Mucho"

Album of the Year
Juanes — Juanes MTV Unplugged
Ricardo Arjona — Independiente
Bebe — Un Pokito de Rocanrol
Chico Buarque — Chico
ChocQuibTown — Eso Es Lo Que Hay
Jesse & Joy — ¿Con Quién Se Queda El Perro?
Carla Morrison — Déjenme Llorar
Reik — Peligro
Arturo Sandoval — Dear Diz (Every Day I Think of You)
Caetano Veloso, Gilberto Gil and Ivete Sangalo — Especial Ivete, Gil E Caetano

Song of the YearJesse & Joy and Tommy Torres — "¡Corre!" (Jesse & Joy)Juan Luis Guerra, Juanes and Joaquín Sabina — "Azul Sabina" (Juanes featuring Joaquín Sabina)
Kiko Cibrián, Gilberto Marín, Julio Ramírez and Mónica Vélez — "Creo en Ti" (Reik)
Carla Morrison — "Déjenme Llorar"
Juan Luis Guerra — "En El Cielo No Hay Hospital"
Jose Luis Latorre, Antonio Orozco and Xavi Pérez — "Estoy Hecho de Pedacitos de Ti" (Antonio Orozco featuring Alejandro Fernández)
Ricardo Arjona — "Fuiste Tú" (Ricardo Arjona and Gaby Moreno)
Amaury Gutiérrez and Gian Marco — "Invisible" (Gian Marco)
Alejandro Sanz — "No Me Compares"

Best New Artist3Ball MTYGaby Amarantos
Deborah del Corral
Elaín
Ulises Hadjis
Los Mesoneros
Juan Magan
Rosario Ortega
Piso 21
Ana Victoria

Pop
Best Contemporary Pop AlbumJesse & Joy — ¿Con Quién Se Queda El Perro?Pablo Alborán — En Acústico
Chambao — Chambao
Beatriz Luengo — Bela y Sus Moskitas Muertas
Pamela Rodriguez — Reconocer
 
Best Traditional Pop AlbumDavid Bisbal — Una Noche en el Teatro RealPepe Aguilar — Negociaré con la pena
Sergio Dalma — Vía Dalma II
Presuntos Implicados — Banda Sonora
Pasión Vega — Sin Compasión

Urban
Best Urban Music AlbumDon Omar — Don Omar Presents MTO²: New GenerationJ Alvarez — Otro Nivel de Música Reloaded
Tego Calderón — The Original Gallo del País
Farruko — The Most Powerful Rookie
Ana Tijoux — La Bala
 
Best Urban SongDon Omar — "Hasta Que Salga el Sol"Max Deniro, Sak Noel, Pitbull, William Reyna and DJ Buddha — "Crazy People" (Sensato featuring Pitbull and Sak Noel)
Don Omar and Milton "Alcover" Restituyo — "Dutty Love" (Don Omar featuring Natti Natasha)
Alexis & Fido — "Energía"
Daddy Yankee — "Lovumba"

Rock
Best Rock AlbumMolotov — Desde Rusia Con AmorLos Mesoneros — Indeleble
No Te Va Gustar — Público
San Pascualito — Valiente
Viniloversus — Cambié de Nombre

Best Pop/Rock AlbumEl Cuarteto de Nos — PorfiadoJotdog — Turista de Amor
Leiva — Diciembre
Los Claxons — Camino A Encontrarte
Vega — La Cuenta Atrás

Best Rock SongRoberto Musso — "Cuando Sea Grande" (El Cuarteto de Nos)Manuel Diquez — "Anti Idolo"
Leo Felipe Campos and Ulises Hadjis — "Dónde Va" (Ulises Hadjis)
Doctor Krápula — "Exigimos"
Luis Jiménez — "Indeleble" (Los Mesoneros)

Alternative
Best Alternative Music AlbumCarla Morrison — Déjenme LlorarLisandro Aristimuño — Mundo Anfibio
ChocQuibTown — Eso Es Lo Que Hay
Ulises Hadjis — Cosas Perdidas
Kinky — Sueño de la Máquina

Best Alternative SongCarla Morrison — "Déjenme Llorar"Bebe — "Mi Guapo"
Juan Campodónico and Jorge Drexler — "1987" (Campo)
John King, Kinky and Mala Rodríguez — "Negro Día" (Kinky)
Caetano Veloso — "Neguinho" (Gal Costa)

Tropical
Best Salsa AlbumLuis Enrique  — Soy y SeréRubén Blades and Cheo Feliciano  — Eba Say Ajá
Mambo Legend Orchestra — Watch Out! Ten Cuidao!
Víctor Manuelle — Busco un Pueblo
Tito Nieves — Mi Última Grabación

Best Cumbia/Vallenato AlbumJuan Piña — Le Canta A San JacintoJorge Celedón and Jimmy Zambrano — Lo Que Tú Necesitas
Silvestre Dangond and Juancho De la Espriella — No Me Compares Con Nadie
Diomedes Díaz and Álvaro López — Con Mucho Gusto Caray
Omar Geles  — Histórico - A Duo Con Los Grandes

Best Contemporary Tropical AlbumMilly Quezada — Aquí Estoy YoElain — Volando Alto - Made on the Road
Juan Formell and Los Van Van — La Maquinaria
Gaitanes — Caminos
Maía — Instinto

Best Traditional Tropical AlbumEliades Ochoa — Un Bolero Para TíMiguel García — Guarachando
Plenealo — Soy Yo
Quinteto Criollo — La Trova de Siempre
Son de Tikiza — Bolero

Best Tropical Fusion AlbumFonseca — Ilusión+Caseroloops — Afronauta
Sergent Garcia — Una y Otra Vez
Juan Magan — The King of Dance
Prince Royce — Phase II

Best Tropical SongYoel Henríquez and Alex Puentes — "Toma Mi Vida" (Milly Quezada featuring Juan Luis Guerra)Tamela — "¡Acércate!" (Tamela featuring Son de Tikizia)
Alejandro Bassi and Fonseca — "Desde Que No Estás" (Fonseca)
Chino & Nacho and Pablo Villalobos — "El Poeta" (Chino & Nacho)
Yoel Henríquez, Horacio Palencia and Jorge Luis Piloto — "Eres Linda" (Tito Nieves)

Singer-Song Writer
Best Singer-Song Writer AlbumGian Marco — 20 AñosRicardo Arjona — Independiente
Chico Buarque — Chico
José Luis Perales — Calle Soledad
Rosana — ¡¡Buenos Dias, Mundo!!

Regional Mexican
Best Ranchero AlbumPepe Aguilar — Mas de Un CaminoShaila Dúrcal — Así
Pedro Fernández — No Que No...
Miguel y Miguel — Aquí En El Rancho
Trio Ellas — Trio Ellas

Best Banda AlbumLa Arrolladora Banda El Limón — Irreversible... 2012Cristina — Golpes de Pecho
La Addictiva Banda San José de Mesillas — Nada Iguales
Fidel Rueda — Sinaloense Hasta Las Chachas
Beto Zapata — Prisionero de tus Brazos

Best Tejano AlbumJoe Posada — Algo Esta PasandoAvizo — Mas Amigos
Los Desperadoz — Sunset Run
Los Hermanos Farías — Back On Track
Jay Pérez — The Voice of Authority

Best Norteño AlbumLos Tucanes de Tijuana — 365 DíasRegulo Caro — Amor En Tiempos de Guerra
Duelo — Vuela Muy Alto
Implakable — Simplemente
Gerardo Ortíz — Entre Dios Y El Diablo
Siggno — Lo Que Me Dejastes

Best Regional Mexican SongLuis Carlos Monroy and Adrian Pieragostino — "El Mejor Perfume" (La Original Banda El Limón de Salvador Lizárraga)Ismael Gallegos and Alberto "Beto" Jimenez Maeda — "Ay Mi México" (Mariachi Divas de Cindy Shea)
Charlie Corona and Jesse Turner — "Como Me Acuerdo de Ti" (Siggno)
Luis Carlos Monroy and Adrian Pieragostino — "El Día Que Me Fuí" (Shaila Dúrcal)
Manuel Eduardo Toscano — "Vivo Contenta" (Paquita la del Barrio)

Instrumental
Best Instrumental AlbumChick Corea, Eddie Gómez and Paul Motian — Further ExplorationsPaquito D'Rivera and Berta Rojas — Día y Medio
Guinga + Quinteto Villa-Lobos — Rasgando Seda
Hamilton de Holanda — Brasilianos 3
Miguel Zenón — Alma Adentro: The Puerto Rican Songbook

Traditional
Best Folk AlbumLila Downs — Pecados y MilagrosReynaldo Armas — Me Emborrache Pa' Olvidarla
Eva Ayllón + Inti-Illimani — Eva Ayllón + Inti-Illimani Histórico
Luciano Pereyra — Con Alma de Pueblo
Chuchito Valdés and Eddy Navia — Piano y Charango
 
Best Tango AlbumArturo Sandoval — Tango Como Yo Te SientoCarlos Bosio — El Tango Lo Siento Así
Cuartetango String Quartet — Masters of Bandoneon
Susana Rinaldi — Experimentango
Tango VIP — Grandes Varones del Tango

Best Flamenco AlbumPaco de Lucía — En Vivo Conciertos España 2010Antonio Cortés — Cuando Quieras
Niño Josele — El Mar de Mi Ventana
Diana Navarro — Flamenco
Various Artists — México Flamenco

Jazz
Best Latin Jazz AlbumArturo Sandoval — Dear Diz (Every Day I Think of You)Jerry Gonzalez and El Comando de la Clave — Jerry González and El Comando de la Clave
Tania Maria — Tempo
Poncho Sanchez and Terence Blanchard — Chano y Dizzy!
Chuchito Valdes — Live in Chicago

Christian
Best Christian Album (Spanish Language)Marcos Witt — 25 Concierto ConmemorativoPaulina Aguirre — Rompe El Silencio
Carlos Carcache — Aquí En Tu Presencia
Generasion — Yo Soy Generasion
Jacobo Ramos — Dile Al Corazón Que Camine
Tercer Cielo — Lo Que El Viento Me Enseñó

Best Christian Album (Portuguese Language)Aline Barros — Aline Barros & Cia 3Paulo César Baruk e Banda Salluz — Eletro Acústico 3
Cantores de Deus — Mulheres Ao Vivo
Grupo Chamas — Inquieto Coraçao
Ministério de Louvor Diante do Trono — Diante do Trono 14 - Sol da Justiça

Brazilian
Best Brazilian Contemporary Pop AlbumSeu Jorge — Músicas Para Churrascos Vol. 1Céu — Caravana Sereia Bloom
Zeila Duncan — Pelo Sabor do Gesto em Cena
Rita Lee — Reza
Mart'nália — Não Tente Comprender

Best Brazilian Rock AlbumBeto Lee — Celebração & SacrificíoCPM 22 — Depois de Um Longo Inverno
Ira! e Ultraje A Rigor — Ao Vivo no Rock in Rio
NX Zero — Multishow ao Vivo NX Zero 10 Anos
RPM — Elektra

Best Samba/Pagode AlbumBeth Carvalho — Nosso Samba Tá na RuaEmilio Santiago — So Danço Samba ao VivoAlcione — Duas Faces ao Vivo na Mangueira
Sorriso Maroto — 15 Anos ao Vivo
Thiaguinho — Ousadia & Alegria

Best MPB AlbumCaetano Veloso, Gilberto Gil and Ivete Sangalo — Especial Ivete, Gil e CaetanoMaria Bethânia — Oásis de Bethânia
João Bosco — 40 Anos Depois
Ivan Lins — Amorágio
Marisa Monte — O Que Você Quer Saber de Verdade
Leila Pinheiro — Raiz
Maria Rita — Elo

Best Sertaneja Music AlbumChitãozinho & Xororó — Chitãozinho & Xororó - 40 Anos - Sinfônico Daniel — Pra Ser Feliz
Fernando & Sorocaba — Acústico na Ópera de Arame
Paula Fernandes — Meus Encantos
Luan Santana — Quando Chega a Noite
Michel Teló — Michel na Balada
Victor e Leo — Amor de Alma

Best Brazilian Roots AlbumDominguinhos — Iluminado Gaby Amarantos — Treme
Oswaldinho ao Accordion — Forró Chorado
Jammil — Jammil na Real
Daniela Mercury — Canibália - Ritmos do Brasil (Ao Vivo)

Best Brazilian SongChico Buarque — "Querido Diário"Pretinho da Serrinha, Leandro Fab and Seu Jorge — "A Doida" (Seu Jorge)
Antonio Dyggs and Sharon Axé Moi — "Ai Se Eu Te Pego" (Michel Teló)
Arnaldo Antunes and Marisa Monte — "Ainda Bem" (Marisa Monte)
Lenine and Ivan Santos — "Amor é Pra Quem Ama" (Lenine)

Children's
Best Latin Children's AlbumMaría Teresa Chacín — María Teresa Chacín Canta CuentosMiguelito — Tiempo de Navidad
Rita Rosa y Amigos — Canciones de Agua
Various Artists — Disney's Los Muppets Banda Sonora Original de Walt Disney Records
Xuxa — Xuxa só para Baixinhos 11 - Sustentabilidade

Classical
Best Classical AlbumCuarteto Latinoamericano — Brasileiro: Works of Francisco MignoneGuillermo Figueroa, I Solisti di Zagreb and Pepe Romero — Cordero: Caribbean Concertos For Guitar and For Violin
Javier Perianes and Josep Pons — Da Falla: Noches En Los Jardines de España
José Serebrier — Dvorak Symphony No. 7; In Nature's Realm, Scherzo Capriccioso
Gabriel Castagna — Fiesta Criolla: Latin-American Orchestral Works
Quarteto Radamés Gnattali — Prelúdio 21: Quartetos das Ordas

Best Classical Contemporary CompositionYalil Guerra — "Seducción" (Elizabeth Rebozo)Tania León — "Inura"
Gustavo Casenave — "Miñoqui"
Aurelio de la Vega — "Preludio No. 1" (Elizabeth Rebozo)
Leo Brouwer — "Quartet No. 4 - Rem Tene Verba Sequentur (Know the Matter and the Word Will Follow)" (Havana String Quartet)
Tim Rescala — "Quarteto Circular"
Carlos Franzetti — "Stringazo" (Cuartetango String Quartet)

Recording Package
Best Recording PackageMiguel Masa — Cambié de Nombre (Viniloversus)MZK — Bixinga 70 (Bixiga70)
Alejandro Ros — Canciones Para Aliens (Fito Páez)
Pablo Martínez — Indeleble (Los Mesoneros)
Mago — Ves Lo Que Quieres Ver (Bareto)

Production
Best Engineered AlbumGregg Field, Don Murray and Paul Blakemore — Dear Diz (Every Day I Think of You) (Arturo Sandoval)Madre Música and André Dias — Brasilianos 3 (Hamilton de Holanda)
Bruno Giorgi and Carlos Freitas — Chão (Lenine)
Julio Boscher, Walter Costa, Duda Mello, Leonel Pereda, Carlos Toré and Ricardo Garcia — Liebe Paradiso (Celso Fonseca e Ronaldo Bastos)
Alexandre Gaiotto — O Canto da Sereia (Regina Benedetti)

Producer of the YearJuan Luis GuerraMoogie Canazio
Gregg Field
Sergio George
Martin Terefe

Music Video
Best Short Form Music VideoJesse & Joy — "Me Voy"Catupecu Machu — "Metrópolis Nueva"
Georgina — "Rara"
Nevilton — "Tempos de Maracujá"
Rakel — "En El Tiempo"

Best Long Form Music VideoJuanes — Juanes MTV Unplugged'Enrique Bunbury — Licenciado Cantinas, The MovieManuel Galbán — Blue Cha ChaShakira — Live from ParisCaetano Veloso, Gilberto Gil and Ivete Sangalo — Especial Ivete, Gilberto e Caetano''

Special Awards
Lifetime Achievement Award
Luz Casal
Leo Dan
Rita Moreno
Milton Nascimento
Daniela Romo
Poncho Sanchez
Toquinho

Trustees Award
Juan Carmona Habichuela
Yomo Toro

Person of the Year
Caetano Veloso

Performers
01. Intro —
"Latin Grammy 2012" 00:52
02. Pitbull — "Don't Stop The Party" 03:16
03. Pedro Fernández — "No Que No" 02:54
04. Pablo Alborán — "Perdóname" 03:06
05. Juanes featuring Carlos Santana — "Fíjate Bien" 03:47
06. Joan Sebastian — "Diséñame" 03:20
07. 3Ball MTY, featuring El Bebeto, América Sierra and SkyBlu — "Inténtalo (Me Prende)" 03:49
08. Alejandro Sanz — "No Me Compares" 04:37
09. Michel Teló and Blue Man Group — "Ai Se Eu Te Pego" 03:21
10. Jesse & Joy — "¡Corre!" 03:46
11. Juan Luis Guerra 440 — "En El Cielo No Hay Hospital" 02:52
12. Shaila Dúrcal with Mariachi Reyna de Los Angeles  — "El Día Que Me Fui" 03:31
13. David Bisbal — "Lloraré Las Penas" 02:51
14. Lila Downs, Celso Piña and Totó La Momposina — "Zapata Se Queda" 03:59
15. Prince Royce featuring Joan Sebastian — "Incondicional" 02:49
16. Víctor Manuelle — "Si Tú Me Besas" 03:14
17. Gerardo Ortíz — "Aquiles Afirmo" 03:15
18. Kany García — "Alguien" 03:07
19. Daniela Romo and Sergio Dalma — "Yo No Te Pido La Luna" 03:37
20. Juan Magan — "Se Vuelve Loca / No Sigue Modas" 03:12
21. Caetano Veloso and Arturo Sandoval — "Capullito De Alelí" 03:38
22. Sensato featuring Pitbull and Sak Noel — "Crazy People" 03:31

Presenters
Jaime Camil and Ninel Conde — presented Record of the Year
Deborah del Corral and Chino & Nacho — presented Best Traditional Pop Album
Reik — presented Best Contemporary Tropical Album
Galilea Montijo and Sebastián Rulli — presented Best Tropical Fusion Album
Marcelo Córdoba and Ana Victoria — presented Best Norteño Album
ChocQuibTown — Best New Artist
Nelly Furtado and Mark Tacher — presented Song of the Year
Zuria Vega and Gabriel Soto — presented Best Long Form Music Video
Anita Tijoux and Fonseca — Best Contemporary Pop Album
Antonio Orozco and Milly Quezada — presented Best Ranchero Album
Lucero and Cristián de la Fuente (hosts) — announced Person of the Year C
Ana Brenda Contreras and Tommy Torres — presented Best Alternative Music Album
Natalie Cole and Pepe Aguilar — presented Album of the Year

References

External links
Official Site

Latin Grammy Awards
Latin Grammy Awards by year
Grammy Awards
Annual Latin Grammy Awards
Annual Latin Grammy Awards